Bridget Clare Rosewell,  (born 18 September 1951) is a British economist. Her expertise includes economic development, transport and agglomeration economics, development evaluation, infrastructure, forecasting, industry dynamics and competition as well as policy analysis related to these areas.

Early life and education
Born in Wimbledon, England, Rosewell was educated at Wimbledon High School (1958–69) and St Hugh's College, Oxford where she gained a BA in Politics and Economics (1974) and an M.Phil. in Economics (1976). She was a lecturer in economics at St Hilda's College, Oxford (1976–78), and at Somerville College, Oxford (1978–81), then a Tutor in economics at Oriel College, Oxford (1981–84). She was concurrently a research officer in the Department of Economics and Statistics, Oxford University (1976–81).

Career
She was Deputy Director, Economics at the Confederation of British Industry, then left to found a number of consultancies, including Business Strategies Ltd, now part of Experian.

Rosewell is senior adviser of Volterra Partners, which she founded in 1998 with Paul Ormerod. Bridget's current business interests include Chair of Audit for Network Rail, and for Atom Bank and the With Profits Committee for the Royal London Group. She is also a Commissioner for the independent National Infrastructure Commission and has led on its project on Northern connectivity and the East West corridor from Cambridge to Oxford.

Bridget was the Chair of Governors, Wimbledon High School and has previously sat on the boards of Britannia Building Society, Ulster Bank and the Department of Work and Pensions. She was the Chief Economist and Chief Economic Adviser to the Greater London Authority between 2002 and 2012. She has previously founded and developed three successful consultancies. She has also given evidence as an expert witness in a number of major competition cases as well as at several planning Inquiries.

Contributions to the field
Rosewell is interested in the concept of agglomeration, which quantifies the positive effects of the increases in economic density brought about by new infrastructure such as bridges and rail links.

Her work includes studies on risk and risk management, infrastructure and its funding, public and private sector co-operation, planning policy, and corporate management. She publishes and presents in these areas as well as working with clients.

Other work includes studies of the evolution of market structures, including in the market for pollution permits; urban systems; and statistical model validation.

Research interests
Her research interests focus on the economic performance of local economies, the role of infrastructure, the performance of markets, and business organisations. She is especially interested in the application of the tools of complex systems analysis to these issues.

Personal life
She speaks fluent French and some German. She is divorced, with two adult children. Her hobbies include painting, walking, reading and picture-framing.

Honours
In the 2013 Birthday Honours, Rosewell was appointed Officer of the Order of the British Empire (OBE) "for services to the economy". In 2016, she was elected a Fellow of the Academy of Social Sciences (FAcSS). She was appointed Commander of the Order of the British Empire (CBE) in the 2019 New Year Honours for services to the Economy.

References

1951 births
Living people
English economists
British women economists
Officers of the Order of the British Empire
People educated at Wimbledon High School
People from Wimbledon, London
Fellows of the Academy of Social Sciences
Fellows of Somerville College, Oxford
Commanders of the Order of the British Empire